PCI may refer to:

Business and economics
 Payment card industry, businesses associated with debit, credit, and other payment cards
 Payment Card Industry Data Security Standard, a set of security requirements for credit card processors
 Provincial Competitiveness Index, a governance index of Vietnamese provinces
 Ceridian-UCLA Pulse of Commerce Index, a U.S. economic indicator based on trucking fuel consumption
 Per capita income
 Equitable PCI Bank, a Philippine bank

Science and technology
 Panel call indicator, telephone signalling system
 Pavement condition index, used in transportation civil engineering
 Picocurie (pCi), a unit of radioactivity
 Peripheral Component Interconnect, a computer bus
 PCI-X (PCI eXtended), a computer bus
 PCI Express (PCIe), a computer bus
 Projects of Common Interest, a category of EU projects for interconnecting energy infrastructures
 Protocol-control information, in telecommunication
 Pulverized coal injection method, in blast furnaces

Medicine
 Percutaneous coronary intervention, a set of procedures used to treat coronary heart disease
 Photochemical internalization, a light-triggered drug delivery method
 Potato carboxypeptidase inhibitor, a natural peptide usable for thrombolytic and cancer therapy
 Prophylactic cranial irradiation, a management option for certain types of aggressive cancers
 Protein C inhibitor, a serine protease inhibitor

Organizations
 Paralympic Committee of India, which selects athletes to represent India at international athletic meets
 Parti Communiste Internationaliste, a French political party
 Partito Comunista Italiano, a former Italian communist party
 Peer Community in, communities of researchers reviewing and recommending preprints in their field
 Pentecostal Collegiate Institute (New York), 1900–1903, US
 Pentecostal Collegiate Institute (Rhode Island), 1902–1918, US
 Pharmacy Council of India, a statutory body in India
 Porter and Chester Institute, a technical school in Connecticut and Massachusetts, US
 Post Carbon Institute, an organization advocating a more resilient, equitable, and sustainable world
 Presbyterian Church in Ireland, a Protestant denomination in Ireland
 Project Concern International, a humanitarian organization
 Public Communications Inc., a Chicago-based national public relations agency

Other uses
 Duruwa language (ISO 639-3 code)

See also
 PPCI (disambiguation)